Kill Heel is a 2022 South Korean television series directed by Noh Do-cheol and starring  Kim Ha-neul, Lee Hye-young and Kim Sung-ryung. The series depicts life of three women, who have strong desire to achieve success in the home shopping industry. It premiered on tvN on March 9, 2022, and aired every Wednesday and Thursday at 22:30 (KST) for 14 episodes.

Cast and characters

Main 
 Kim Ha-neul as Woo-hyun
39 years old, a show host at UNI Home Shopping. Once a very successful show host with a lot of accordance, now her career is on decline to the level of selling toilet paper.
 Lee Hye-young as Gi Mo-ran
 Kim Min-joo as young Gi Mo-ran 
 CFO, UNI Home Shopping
 Kim Sung-ryung as Bae Ok-sun
 Min Soo-hwa as young Bae Ok-sun
52 years old, a high-class and UNI home shopping signboard show host.

Supporting

People around Woo Hyun 
Kim Jin-woo as Kim Do-il, Woo Hyun's jobless husband 
  Jung Seo-yeon as Kim Ji-yoon, Woo Hyun and Do-il's only daughter

People around Bae Ok-sun 
Jeon No-min as Choi In-guk
In mid 50s, Bae Ok-sun's husband and the son of a prominent politician family. He is currently in the process of campaigning for parliamentary elections.
 Yoon Hyun-soo as Choi Jeong-hyeon 
Bae Ok-sun's son.

UNI Home Shopping People 
Kim Jae-chul as Hyun-wook
In late 40s, the eldest son of UNI Group and president of UNI Home Shopping has a polite and courteous personality.
 Jung Eui-jae as Seo Jun-beom
In mid 30s, a deputy general manager who has been in the company for 6 years.
 Moon Ji-in as Noh Seong-woo
A new PD of home shopping.
 Shim Wan-joon as Park Jong-soo
The team leader of a home shopping company.
 Shin Joo-ah as Go Eun-nara
A UNI home shopping show host
 Kim Do-yeon as Kim Soo-wan
The head of hair and makeup in the dressing room in home shopping.
Kim Hyo-sun as Ahn An-na
UNI Home Shopping Fashion Team Product Planning, who is a popular MD and self-centered to own what she wants.
Park So-eun as Im In-jin
The PD of home shopping.
Yoo Jang-young as Shim Sang-chan 
A shopping host with 2-3 years of experience, he is a savvy person who broadcasts almost all products in home shopping.

Others 
Jeon Gook-hyang as Doil's Parent
Han Soo-yeon as Ham Shin-ae
Hyun-wook's wife and the daughter of a famous chaebol family.
 Kim Hyun-wook as James, Gi Mo-ran's son, a young man in his twenties

Special appearance 
Jung A-mi as Wife of Hyun-wook, president of UNI Home Shopping, and mother of Shin-ae.
 Jung Won-kwan as Delivery man

Production
On November 3, 2021, it was reported that Kim Ha-neul is considering to appear in the TV series a year after 18 Again. Lee Hye-young is appearing in TV series after 3 years, her last appearance was in tvN's 2018 TV series Lawless Lawyer. Park Eun-seok was first offered the role of Seo Jun-beom, a PD in home shopping company, which later went to Jung Eui-jae.

On January 14, 2022, the script reading site was revealed by releasing photos.

Release 
Kill Heel was originally scheduled to be released on February 23, 2022. However, the filming schedule changed due to the aftermath of COVID-19 confirmed at the filming site and the premiere date was postponed for two weeks to March 9, 2022. Kill Heel was originally organized as 16 episodes, ended with 14 episodes, due to internal organizational strategic reasons.

Original soundtrack

Part 1

Part 2

Part 3

Part 4

Part 5

Part 6

Viewership

References

External links
  
 Kill Heel at Daum 
  Kill Heel at Naver 
 

TVN (South Korean TV channel) television dramas
Korean-language television shows
2022 South Korean television series debuts 
2022 South Korean television series endings
South Korean thriller television series